The 2014–15 Louisville Cardinals men's basketball team represented the University of Louisville during the 2014–15 NCAA Division I men's basketball season, Louisville's 101st season of intercollegiate competition. The Cardinals competed in their first season in the Atlantic Coast Conference and were coached by Rick Pitino, in his fourteenth season at U of L. The team played its home games on Denny Crum Court at the KFC Yum! Center in downtown Louisville.

They finished 27–9, 12-6 in ACC play, placing 4th, and earning a double bye in the ACC tournament. Louisville lost its first ever ACC Tournament game to North Carolina and earned at-large bid to the NCAA tournament. In their 41st NCAA Tournament appearance, they defeated UC Irvine, Northern Iowa, and NC State to advance to the Elite Eight where they lost to Michigan State.

On February 20, 2018, the NCAA announced that Louisville will be forced to vacate wins and records from the 2011-12, 2012-13, 2013-14, and 2014-15 seasons.

Departures

Class of 2014 signees

Roster

}

 Akoy Agau left the team at the end of U of L's fall semester after having played only 11 minutes in three games this season. He transferred to Georgetown, where he will be eligible in December 2015 with two-and-a-half remaining seasons of eligibility.
 Chris Jones was dismissed from the team on February 22. He had been suspended from the Syracuse game on February 18 after having sent a threatening text message to a woman he had dated, but was reinstated several days later. After playing against Miami on February 21, he missed that night's curfew, leading to his dismissal. Several days after that, Jones was charged with rape stemming from an incident that allegedly occurred the night of the Miami game. In late April, a grand jury chose not to indict Jones and his two co-defendants in the case.

Schedule

|-
!colspan=12 style="background:#AD0000; color:#FFFFFF;"| Exhibition

|-
!colspan=12 style="background:#AD0000; color:#FFFFFF;"| Non-conference regular season

|-
!colspan=12 style="background:#AD0000; color:#FFFFFF;"| ACC regular season

|-
!colspan=12 style="background:#AD0000; color:#FFFFFF;"| ACC Tournament

|-
!colspan=12 style="background:#AD0000; color:#FFFFFF;"| NCAA tournament

Rankings

References

Louisville
Louisville Cardinals men's basketball seasons
Louisville
Louisville Cardinals men's basketball, 2014-15
Louisville Cardinals men's basketball, 2014-15